Breakfast is the debut studio album by American rap duo Chiddy Bang, released in the United States through I.R.S. Records and Virgin Records on February 21, 2012 and outside the U.S. through Regal Recordings on March 5, 2012. The album includes the singles "Mind Your Manners" and "Ray Charles".

Singles
 "Mind Your Manners" featuring Swedish DJs and duo Icona Pop was released on July 19, 2011 as the album's lead single. The song did not make it to the Billboard Hot 100 but peaked on the Bubbling Under Hot 100 Singles chart at number 15, as well as reaching number 19 on the Top Heatseekers.
 "Ray Charles" was released on November 14, 2011 as the album's second single.
 "Handclaps & Guitars" was the iTunes Single of the Week for the week of February 21 to 28, 2012.

Commercial performance
The album debuted at number 8 on the Billboard 200 with 31,000 copies sold in its first week. As of January 2013, the album has sold 75,000 copies.

Track listing

Charts

Weekly charts

Year-end charts

Release history

References

2012 debut albums
Chiddy Bang albums
I.R.S. Records albums